Ahmosuo Airfield  is an airfield in Hangaskangas, Oulu, Finland, about  southeast from Oulu city centre. The airfield was opened in 1987.

See also
List of airports in Finland

References

External links
 VFR Suomi/Finland – Ahmosuo Airfield
 Lentopaikat.fi – Ahmosuo Airfield 

Airports in Finland
Transport in Oulu
Buildings and structures in Oulu